Gogni Nala is a stream that passes through Kiamari Town, Karachi, Sindh, Pakistan from northeast to the south and drains into the Arabian Sea.

See also
 Malir Town
 Malir River
 Sona Nala
 Thado Nallo

References 

Rivers of Karachi